Pody is a small village in Kherson Raion of Kherson Oblast of Ukraine. It belongs to Oleshky urban hromada, one of the hromadas of Ukraine. The village had a pre-war population of 141 residents.

Until 18 July, 2020, Pody belonged to Oleshky Raion. The raion was abolished in July 2020 as part of the administrative reform of Ukraine, which reduced the number of raions of Kherson Oblast to five. The area of Oleshky Raion was merged into Kherson Raion.

The village is currently under Russian occupation as a result of the 2022 Russian invasion of Ukraine.

References 

Villages in Kherson Raion